Jon Morris (born April 5, 1942) is an American former professional football player who was an offensive lineman for fifteen seasons in the American Football League (AFL) and National Football League (NFL). He played for the Boston/New England Patriots, Detroit Lions, and Chicago Bears.

His father was John D. Morris, a longtime reporter and editor in the Washington bureau of the New York Times. At Gonzaga College High School in Washington, D.C., he was a three-sport athlete in football, basketball and baseball. After Gonzaga, he played center and linebacker for three seasons of college football at the College of the Holy Cross. He was the Washington Daily News's Athlete of the Year in 1960 and Holy Cross Varsity Club Athlete of the Year and Lineman of the Year in 1963. He was selected All-East and All-America in his senior year, captained the Senior Bowl, and played in the College All-Star Game in August.

Morris was inducted into the Holy Cross Hall of Fame in 1973, was an inaugural inductee of the Gonzaga College High School Athletic Hall of Fame in 1983. He was joined in 1991 by his brother Will, who quarterbacked at Gonzaga and the University of Maryland as well serving as Gonzaga head football coach from 1975 to 1978.

The Green Bay Packers, led by head coach and general manager Vince Lombardi, picked Morris in the second round of the 1964 NFL Draft (27th overall), however Morris chose to go with the Boston Patriots, who selected him in the fourth round (29th overall) of the AFL draft. Morris was the team's Rookie of the Year in 1964, and their "Unsung Hero" in 1965. He was an AFL All-Star six times, 1964 through 1969, and was an AFC Pro Bowl Center in 1970; he was the first Patriot to be selected for the AFC Pro Bowl. Morris was named to the second-team, All-Time All-AFL, and to the fan-selected Boston Patriots All-1960s Team. He played 128 games for the Patriots, the eighth best individual record in club history. Morris played three years (1975–1977) with the Detroit Lions, elected by Lions teammates as their "Offensive Player of the Year" in 1975.

Morris recovered several fumbles during his career.  The first was a fumble by running back Ron Burton in the Boston Patriots' 24-7 victory over the Kansas City Chiefs at Fenway Park on October 23, 1964.  In 1966, he recovered a fumble by running back Larry Garron in the Patriots' 27–27 tie with the Kansas City Chiefs at Municipal Stadium on November 20. He also recovered a fumble by fullback Jim Nance in a 16–0 loss to the Houston Oilers at Fenway on October 13, 1968.

Morris wore #56 for the Patriots, as did Pro Football Hall of Fame LB Andre Tippett.

After his playing career, Morris worked as the color commentator on Patriots radio broadcasts from 1979 to 1987, followed by color analysis of NFL games for NBC television.

In 2011, Jon Morris was selected by a senior selection committee as a member of the Patriots Hall of Fame.

See also
 List of American Football League players

References

External links
 New England Patriots bio

1942 births
Living people
American Conference Pro Bowl players
American Football League All-Star players
American Football League All-Time Team
American football offensive linemen
Boston Patriots players
Chicago Bears players
Detroit Lions players
Gonzaga College High School alumni
Holy Cross Crusaders football players
National Football League announcers
New England Patriots announcers
New England Patriots players
Players of American football from Washington, D.C.
College of DuPage Chaparrals football players
American Football League players